Yoshiyuki Ishihara (石原 慶幸, born September 7, 1979 in Gifu, Japan) is a Japanese former professional baseball player. He has played in Nippon Professional Baseball (NPB) for the Hiroshima Toyo Carp.

Career

On October 5, 2002, Ishihara made his NPB debut.

On October 12, 2020, Ishihara announced his retirement after the season.

References

External links

1979 births
Living people
Baseball people from Gifu Prefecture
Hiroshima Toyo Carp players
Japanese baseball players
National baseball team players
Nippon Professional Baseball catchers
2009 World Baseball Classic players
People from Ōgaki
Japanese baseball coaches
Nippon Professional Baseball coaches